The 2005–06 Combined Counties Football League season was the 28th in the history of the Combined Counties Football League, a football competition in England.

Premier Division

The Premier Division featured one new team in a league of 22 teams after the promotion of Walton Casuals to the Isthmian League.
Bedfont Green, promoted from Division One

Also: 
AFC Guildford changed name to Guildford United
Chessington United changed name to Mole Valley Predators
Godalming & Guildford changed name to Godalming Town

League table

Division One

Division One featured four new teams in a league of 17 teams:
AFC Wallingford, relegated from the Premier Division
Hanworth Villa, joined from the Middlesex County League
Hartley Wintney, relegated from the Premier Division
Tongham

Also, Netherne Village changed their name to Netherne.

League table

References

 League tables

External links
 Combined Counties League Official Site

2005-06
9